Fatima Sulaiman Dahman (born November 10, 1992 in Taiz) is a Yemeni sprinter. She competed in the 100 metres competition at the 2012 Summer Olympics; she ran the preliminaries in 13.95 seconds, which did not qualify her for Round 1.

References

External links
 

1992 births
Living people
Yemeni female sprinters
Olympic athletes of Yemen
Athletes (track and field) at the 2012 Summer Olympics
People from Taiz
Athletes (track and field) at the 2010 Asian Games
Asian Games competitors for Yemen
World Athletics Championships athletes for Yemen